Hélène Liebmann née Riese (16 December 1795 – 2 December 1869) was a German pianist and composer. She was born in Berlin and studied music with Franz Lauska and Ferdinand Ries. A child prodigy, she made her debut before age 13 and published her Piano Sonata when she was 15. She married around 1814 and may have moved with her husband to Vienna and then London. She was present at a Clara Wieck (Schumann) concert in 1835.

Works
Liebmann composed songs, sonatas and piano works. Selected works include:
Grand Quatuor, Op 13
Grand Sonata, Op 11 (Grande Sonate pour Pianoforte et Violoncelle)
Kennst du das Land? Op 3, setting from Goethe's Wilhelm Meister
Violin Sonata Op 9

References

1795 births
1835 deaths
19th-century classical composers
19th-century classical pianists
19th-century German composers
German classical composers
German classical pianists
German women classical composers
German women pianists
Musicians from Berlin
Women classical pianists
19th-century women composers
19th-century women pianists